Events in the year 1934 in Brazil.

Incumbents

Federal government 
 President: Getúlio Vargas (Head of the Provisional Government before 20 July)
 Vice President: none

Governors 
 Alagoas: 
 till 2 March: Alfonso de Carvalho 
 2 March-1 May: Themistocles Vieira de Azevedo
 from 1 May: Osman Laurel
 Amazonas: Nélson de Melo
 Bahia: Juracy Magalhães
 Ceará: Roberto Carneiro de Mendonça (till 5 September); Filipe Moreira Lima (from 5 September)
 Espírito Santo: João Punaro Bley
 Goiás:
 till 21 June: Pedro Ludovico Teixeira
 21 June-19 July: Inácio Bento de Loyola
 19 July-3 August: Vasco dos Reis Gonçalves
 3 August-9 October: Pedro Ludovico Teixeira
 9 October-18 October: Heitor Morais Fleury
 from 18 October: Pedro Ludovico Teixeira
 Maranhão: Benedito Valadares Ribeiro
 Mato Grosso: César de Mesquita Serva then Leônidas Antero de Matos
 Minas Gerais: Benedito Valadares Ribeiro
 Pará: Joaquim de Magalhães Barata
 Paraíba: Gratuliano da Costa Brito (until 26 December); José Marques da Silva Mariz (from 26 December)
 Paraná: Manuel Ribas
 Pernambuco: Carlos de Lima Cavalcanti
 Piauí: Landry Sales
 Rio Grande do Norte: Mario Leopoldo Pereira da Camera
 Rio Grande do Sul: José Antônio Flores da Cunha
 Santa Catarina: Aristiliano Ramos
 São Paulo: Armando de Sales Oliveira
 Sergipe: Augusto Maynard Gomes

Vice governors 
 Rio Grande do Norte: no vice governor
 São Paulo: no vice governor

Events 
16 July - The Vargas government introduces what will be the shortest-lived Constitution of Brazil, lasting only 3 years (until 1937).  It is the first time a Brazilian constitution has been written from scratch by directly elected deputies in multi-party elections, and incorporates a number of improvements to Brazilian political, social and economical life. 
17 July - In the presidential election, carried out by the Constituent Assembly, acting president Getúlio Vargas receives 175 of the 248 votes.
date unknown 
The University of São Paulo is established.
The Brazilian Institute of Geography and Statistics is founded under the title of the National Institute of Statistics.

Arts and culture

Books
Jorge Amado - Suor
Monteiro Lobato - Emília no País da Gramática and Aritmética da Emília
Carolina Nabuco - A Sucessora

Films
O Caçador de Diamantes

Births 
4 January - Elias Gleizer, comedian and actor (died 2015)
18 January - Zacarias, comedy actor (died 1990)
9 February - Ruth Volgl Cardoso, chess grandmaster (died 2000)
30 June - Luiz Carlos Bresser-Pereira, economist and social scientist
8 August - Cláudio Hummes, Roman Catholic cardinal
27 August - Sylvia Telles, singer (died 1966) 
15 October - Flávio Migliaccio, writer, director and screenwriter (died 2020)

Deaths 
5 February - Ernesto Nazareth, composer (born 1863)
6 April - Ismael Nery, artist (born 1900; tuberculosis) 
29 May - Augusto Pestana, engineer and politician (born 1868)
30 May - Júlia Lopes de Almeida, writer (born 1862)
9 June - Medeiros e Albuquerque, poet, politician and journalist (born 1867)
6 July - Prince Peter of Saxe-Coburg and Gotha, son of Princess Leopoldina of Brazil (born 1866)
28 November - Coelho Neto, writer and politician (born 1864)

See also 
1934 in Brazilian football

References

See also 
1934 in Brazilian football
List of Brazilian films of 1934

 
1930s in Brazil
Years of the 20th century in Brazil
Brazil
Brazil